Lisbon High School may refer to the following schools in the United States:
Lisbon High School (Iowa), Lisbon, Iowa
Lisbon High School (Maine), Lisbon Falls, Maine
Lisbon High School (North Dakota), Lisbon, North Dakota